The women's 4 × 100 metres relay event at the 1981 Summer Universiade was held at the Stadionul Naţional in Bucharest on 26 July 1981.

Results

References

Athletics at the 1981 Summer Universiade
1981